The Ford Show (also known as The Ford Show, Starring Tennessee Ernie Ford and The Tennessee Ernie Ford Show) is an American variety program, starring singer and folk humorist Tennessee Ernie Ford, which aired on NBC on Thursday evenings from October 4, 1956, to June 29, 1961. The show was sponsored by the Ford Motor Company, whose founders shared a last name with the host but had no known relation. Beginning in September 1958, the show was telecast in color, and was broadcast from NBC Studios at 3000 W. Alameda Avenue in Burbank, California. It is also one of the first places that showed Charles M. Schulz's Peanuts characters in animated form, which, like the later specials, was directed by Bill Melendez. It became one of the most popular segments of his show.

Selected guest stars

 Ben Alexander
 Cliff Arquette
 Lloyd Bridges
 Sally Brophy 
 Terry Burnham
 Allen Case
 Andy Devine
 Robert Horton
 Lee Marvin 
 Darren McGavin 
 Tom Nolan
 John Payne
 Cesar Romero 
 Roger Smith 
 Mickey Spillane 
 Craig Stevens
 Guy Williams
 Charles Laughton
 Jo Stafford
 Shari Lewis

Production notes
The Ford Show was produced and directed by Bud Yorkin. Television icon Norman Lear was also a writer on The Ford Show, though he has claimed that Roland Kibbee was in fact the show's main writer and that he merely wrote the opening monologues.  Lear has also stated that both Yorkin and Kibbee were in charge on the show's production. The program was officially named not for the host, but for the show's sponsor, the Ford Motor Company.

See also
 For other TV series sponsored by Ford Motor Company, see Ford Television Theatre, Ford Startime, Ford Festival, and Ford Star Jubilee

References

External links
 

1956 American television series debuts
1961 American television series endings
1950s American variety television series
1960s American variety television series
Black-and-white American television shows
English-language television shows
NBC original programming
Ford Motor Company